{{DISPLAYTITLE:Technetium (99mTc) pentetic acid}}

Technetium (99mTc) pentetic acid, sold under the brand name Draximage DTPA among others, is a radiopharmaceutical medication used in nuclear medicine to image the brain, kidneys, or lungs. It is given by intravenous injection or via aerosol spray. It consists of technetium-99m bound to the conjugate base of pentetic acid, with sodium as an additional cation.

Medical uses 
Technetium (99mTc) pentetic acid is indicated for use in the diagnosis of the brain, kidneys, or lungs.

References 

 
Radiopharmaceuticals